Oliver Brian Sanderson Poole, 1st Baron Poole  (11 August 191128 January 1993), was a British Conservative Party politician, soldier and businessman.

Early life
Oliver Brian Sanderson Poole was born at 6 Montagu Mansions, St Marylebone, London, on 11 August 1911,  the only child of Donald Louis Poole, an insurance broker and a member of Lloyd's of London, and his wife Therese Lillian  Frodsham. He was educated at Eton and Christ Church, Oxford, where he played polo for the university. He graduated in 1932 as a Bachelor of Arts (B.A.).

Military service
Poole served in the Life Guards for nine months, and was commissioned as an officer in the Warwickshire Yeomanry in 1934. During the Second World War, he fought in Syria, Iraq, North Africa, Italy and North-West Europe, rising to become a colonel in the British Army on the staff of the 21st Army Group. He was thrice mentioned in despatches. He was appointed to the Order of the British Empire as a Member (military) on 18 February 1943, and was promoted to be an Officer (military) on 16 September that year, and Commander (military) on 11 October 1945. He was also appointed to the American Legion of Merit as a Legionnaire "in recognition of distinguished services in the cause of the Allies" on 15 March 1945, and to the Dutch Order of Orange-Nassau with Swords (denoting the military division) as a Commander on 16 January 1947.

Political career
Poole was elected Member of Parliament for Oswestry in the 1945 general election, but stood down at the 1950 general election. He was later Joint Honorary Treasurer of the Conservative Party from 1952 to 1955, its Chairman from 1955 to 1957, its Deputy Chairman from 1957 to 1959, its joint chairman with Iain Macleod in 1963 and its vice-chairman from 1963 to 1964. In the 1958 Birthday Honours, he was raised to the peerage, and was gazetted on 11 July as Baron Poole, of Aldgate in the City of London. In the 1963 Birthday Honours, he was sworn of the Privy Council.

Business career
In 1933, Poole joined a firm of building contractors in Birmingham. He joined the family business, John Poole & Son Ltd, insurance brokers, in the city, in 1939, and became a member of Lloyd's. In 1950, he joined S. Pearson & Sons Ltd on the invitation of his friend Weetman Pearson, 3rd Viscount Cowdray, and became its chief executive. He oversaw the expansion of the company through the acquisition of the Financial Times, Penguin Books, Longman, Château Latour, and Royal Doulton. From 1950 to 1965, he was a director of Lazard Brothers & Co, a London merchant bank in which Pearsons owned 80 per cent of the stock, and was its chairman from 1965 to 1973. He also became a member of the board of Fiat, in Turin, in 1972, and a trustee of the National Gallery in 1973.

Family
Poole married Betty Margaret, daughter of Captain Dugald Stewart Gilkison, on 6 September 1933. They had one son and three daughters: Caroline, Alison Victoria, Sheila Marian and David Charles. They divorced in 1951. He married Daphne Wilma Kenyon Bowles, daughter of Eustace Bowles and formerly wife of Brigadier Algernon Heber-Percy, on 9 May 1952. They had no children and were divorced in 1965. He married Barbara Ann Taylor, the only daughter of E. A. Taylor, on 4 April 1966. They had no children.

Poole was confined to a wheelchair after he suffered a stroke in 1974. He spent summers at his villa in Castellina in Chianti, in Tuscany. 
He died from bronchopneumonia at his home at 24 Campden Hill Gate in Kensington, London, on 28 January 1993. He was survived by his third wife (who died in ) and his four children from his first marriage, and was succeeded in the barony by his son David.

References

External links 
 

1911 births
1993 deaths
Military personnel from London
People educated at Eton College
Alumni of Christ Church, Oxford
People from Marylebone
Commanders of the Order of the British Empire
Members of the Privy Council of the United Kingdom
Chairmen of the Conservative Party (UK)
Foreign recipients of the Legion of Merit
Commanders of the Order of Orange-Nassau
Hereditary barons created by Elizabeth II
Conservative Party (UK) MPs for English constituencies
Members of the Parliament of the United Kingdom for constituencies in Shropshire
Politicians from London
UK MPs 1945–1950
UK MPs who were granted peerages
British Army personnel of World War II
British Life Guards soldiers
Warwickshire Yeomanry officers